Henry Miller House may refer to:

in the United States
(by state)
Henry F. Miller House, in Orange, Connecticut, listed on the National Register of Historic Places (NRHP)
Henry Miller House (Bellevue, Idaho), NRHP-listed
Henry W. Miller House, near Galena, Illinois, NRHP-listed
Henry B. Miller House, Portland, Oregon, NRHP-listed
Henry Miller House (Mossy Creek, Virginia), NRHP-listed
Henry Miller House (Wausau, Wisconsin), listed on the NRHP in Marathon County, Wisconsin